Paul John Perri (born November 6, 1953) is an American-Canadian film and television actor. Perri is best known for portraying Edwards and Skinless Parker in Hellraiser: Bloodline, Harry Hume from Chaos,  and as Dr. Sidney Bloom from Manhunter.

Background
Perri and his wife, Michele Miner are the parents of Giacomo Miner Perri and Justine Miner Perri. Perri is the older brother of James Perri and younger brother of Ralph Perri and Catherine Perri. He was born in New Haven, Connecticut, U.S.A. in 1953. Paul Perri also has extensive theatre credits (USA) including Broadway, Off Broadway, and regional.

Filmography

Film
Hit and Run (1983) - David Marks
Manhunter (1986) - Dr. Sidney Bloom
Delta Force 2: The Colombian Connection (1990) - Maj. Bobby Chavez
Memoirs of an Invisible Man (1992) - Gomez
Demolition Man (1993) - Squad Leader
Without Evidence (1995) - Sgt. Unsoeld
Live Nude Girls (1995) - Jerome's Friend
Freeway (1996) - Cop #1
Hellraiser: Bloodline (1996) - Edwards / Skinless Parker
The Funeral (1996) - Young Ray
Dead Men Can't Dance (1997) - Maj. Shelby
October 22 (1998) - Police Captain
The Insider (1999) - Geologist / FBI Man
Moonlight Mile (2002) - Public Defender
Chaos (2005) - Harry Hume
Hannah Montana: The Movie (2009) - Father on the Pier
Vice (2018) - Trent Lott

Television

References

External links

1953 births
Living people
20th-century American male actors
American male film actors
American male television actors
Canadian male film actors
Canadian male television actors
American people of Italian descent
American people of Canadian descent
Canadian people of Italian descent
Canadian people of American descent
Male actors from New Haven, Connecticut